CGS Graham Bell was a Canadian government tugboat that was wrecked, and beached, while operating out of Churchill, Manitoba. Entering service in 1929, Graham Bell was brought to Churchill specifically to aid in the construction of port facilities. Operating out of Churchill, Graham Bell left only during the Second World War after being loaned by the government to assist in towing duties along the East Coast of Canada. Following the war, the tugboat returned to Churchill.

Description

Service history
Constructed by Davie Shipbuilding with the yard number 504, the tugboat was launched at Levis, Quebec on 11 June 1929. Graham Bell was then towed to Churchill, Manitoba by another tug, Ocean Eagle, in 1929, to assist in the construction of new port facilities.

During the Second World War Graham Bell left Churchill, when the vessel was pressed into service on the East Coast of Canada for towing duties. The tugboat returned to Churchill following the war. where she was grounded.

Notes

References

Sources
 

1929 ships
Tugboats of the Royal Canadian Navy
Tugboats of Canada
Water transport in Manitoba
Shipwrecks of the Canadian Arctic coast
Canadian Government Ship